Charani Liyanage (born 5 July 1991) is a Sri Lankan rugby sevens player. She was named in Sri Lanka's squad for the 2022 Commonwealth Games in Birmingham where they finished eighth overall.

References 

Living people
1991 births
Female rugby sevens players
Sri Lanka international women's rugby sevens players
Rugby sevens players at the 2022 Commonwealth Games